The Zeppelin D.I, or Zeppelin-Lindau D.I or Zeppelin D.I (Do), as named in German documents, also sometimes referred to postwar as the Dornier D.I or Dornier-Zeppelin D.I, for the designer, was a single-seat all-metal stressed skin monocoque cantilever-wing biplane fighter, developed by Claude Dornier while working for Luftschiffbau Zeppelin at their Lindau facility. It was too late to see operational service with the German Air Force (Luftstreitkräfte) during World War I.

Development and design

The Dornier D.I was one of several designs by Claude Dornier to have an all-metal stressed skin monocoque structure, and it was the first fighter to feature such construction and although production was halted prior to the completion of any production versions, it was also the first aircraft with these features to go into production. To reduce the hazards of inflight fires it also had an external fuel tank which may have been jettisonable, according to some sources and thick-section cantilever wings for improved aerodynamics. The Dornier Do H Falke monoplane was developed from it with an enlarged upper wing compensating for the removal of the lower wing.

Operational history

Seven prototypes were built for the development program but it was never used operationally due to the end of World War I. Luftstreitkräfte (German Air Force) pilots evaluated the type in May and June 1918 and again in October. German ace Wilhelm Reinhard was killed on 3 July 1918 after a structural failure when it was supposed to have been grounded for structural improvements. There were reports of heavy aileron controls and poor climb rates at altitude. After being fitted with a more powerful BMW IIIa inline-six liquid-cooled engine that reduced the time needed to rate to reach  from 25 minutes to 13 minutes, an order was placed for 50 aircraft either in October or November. These were roughly 50 percent complete when production was halted following the armistice in early 1919. One example went to the US Navy and another to the US Army Air Service, both purchased in 1921 and delivered in 1922, for evaluation of the novel construction methods used.

Operators
 
Luftstreitkräfte - evaluation only
 
United States Navy - one example for evaluation, serialed A6058		
United States Air Service - one example for evaluation, serialed AS.68546, McCook Field Project Number P.241

Specifications (BMW engine)

See also

References

Citations

Bibliography

 

1910s German fighter aircraft
Dornier aircraft
Biplanes
Single-engined tractor aircraft
Military aircraft of World War I
Aircraft first flown in 1918